George Heriot (1563–1624) was a Scottish goldsmith and philanthropist.

George Heriot may also refer to:

George Heriot (goldsmith, died 1610) (1539/40–1610), Scottish goldsmith and politician, father of the above
George Heriot (artist) (1759–1839), Scottish painter

See also
George Heriot's School